The Rosser Reeves Ruby is one of the world's largest and finest star rubies, weighing . This Sri Lankan stone is renowned for its great color and well-defined star pattern. The stone is named after advertising mogul Rosser Reeves. Reeves who donated the gem to the Smithsonian in 1965, had carried it around as a lucky stone, and referred to it as "his baby."

Reeves often claimed that he had acquired the stone at an auction in Istanbul in the mid-1950s. He had actually bought the stone from Robert C. Nelson Jr. of New York City who was acting on behalf of Firestone & Parson of Boston. Firestone & Parson sold the gem for Paul Fisher of New York. Robert Fisher, Paul's father, had bought the ruby at an auction in London in 1953. The re-polishing also helped to center the stone's star. 

Articles in the New York World-Telegram and The Sun in 1953 mentioned this fabulous gemstone. The Rosser Reeves Ruby is on display at the Smithsonian.

General resources
Brendan Reeves (Great Grandson of Rosser)

See also
 List of individual gemstones

Individual rubies